In Motion is a 2002 Russian drama film, directorial debut of Filipp Yankovsky. Its plot shares some similarities to La Dolce Vita by Federico Fellini.

Plot
Alexander Guryev is a successful independent journalist whose life has been full of many adventures. Now Sasha is looking for interesting stories and sensations which will earn good money. But Sasha is haunted by failures after such searches and more often than not he runs into big trouble, but still he continues to search for the next bombshell.

Sasha's personal life is different: he is married, but he is no longer attracted to his wife Vera. The passion is gone and only memories remain. Every day Sasha meets various women, with some he has short-term romantic relationships. And his wife Vera continues to hope that one day her and Sasha's life will change for the better.

And then one day Sasha meets an old friend who returned from abroad in order to occupy a major political post. Guryev suddenly realizes that he himself has dug up compromising evidence on his own friend. He begins to understand that his friend is in danger. Now there is only one way out – to run for as long as it is possible, so that at least he can save himself.

Cast
Konstantin Khabensky – Alexander (Sasha) Guryev
Oksana Fandera – Vera
Oksana Akinshina – Anya
Fyodor Bondarchuk – Gazizov
Marina Golub – employee of the archive
Leonid Gromov – investigator
Sergei Gusinsky – judicial officer
Mikhail Yefremov – Vovan
Anastasia von Kalmanovich – Olga
Gosha Kutsenko – guest
Vyacheslav Razbegaev – groom in the club
Alexei Makarov – Alexey
Pavel Melenchuk – Sanyok
Konstantin Murzenko – man with a briefcase
Gennady Ostrovsky – waiter
Elena Perova – Lisa Kolesova
Olga Sidorova – Lena Zorina
Alexandra Skachkova – Lyuda
Alexander Tyutryumov – representative of MegaBank
Nikolai Chindyajkin – Mityagin

Release and reception
The film premiered at the Moscow International Film Festival in the program "Great Expectations". Izvestia wrote: "Almost the entire cinema audience laughed - from the content of dialogues, from the joy of familiarity and in order not to cry. All too recognizable was all that was happening on screen and too accurate".

Awards

2003 Film festival "Vivat Cinema of Russia!" in St. Petersburg
Prize for Best Actor (Konstantin Khabensky)
2003 Kinotavr
Audience Award (Filipp Yankovsky)
2002 The New Russia Cinema Foundation
Diploma "For the highest spectator rating", Prize of the company "YUKOS" (Filipp Yankovsky)
2002 Film festival "Window to Europe" in Vyborg
Special jury prize for directorial debut (Filipp Yankovsky)
2002 International film festival "Listapad" in Minsk
Prize and Diploma of the jury of cinematographers "For the best direction" (Filipp Yankovsky)
2002 Golden Aries Award
For best film editing (Alexander Chupakov))
2002 Nika Award
For the best camerawork (Sergey Machilsky)
2002 Nika Award
In the nomination "Discovery of the Year" (Filipp Yankovsky)
2002 Prize of the Guild of Cinematographers of Russia "White Square"
(Sergey Machilsky)

References

External links

2002 romantic drama films
2002 directorial debut films
2002 films
Films directed by Filipp Yankovsky
Russian romantic drama films
Films produced by Fyodor Bondarchuk